Like a Rose is the second studio album from American country music artist Ashley Monroe. The album was released on March 5, 2013, via Warner Bros. Nashville. The title track served as the album's first single and was released to radio a day before the album. "You Got Me" and "Weed Instead of Roses" were also released as singles.

Content
Ashley Monroe co-wrote all nine of the album's tracks. Little Big Town provides harmony vocals on "You Got Me" (which was co-written by band member Karen Fairchild) and "You Ain't Dolly (And You Ain't Porter)" is a duet with Blake Shelton.

The album's title track, which Monroe wrote with Guy Clark and Jon Randall, came about when Monroe used the phrase "But look at me, I came out like a rose" after telling Clark her life story. The song ultimately "[set] an autobiographical tone" for the record. It was released to radio on March 4, 2013 as the album's first single, and a music video directed by Traci Goudie premiered on CMT one day earlier. "You Got Me" was released as the second single from the album on May 20, 2013, and "Weed Instead of Roses" was released as the third single in September 2013. "Weed Instead of Roses" became Monroe's first chart single from the album when it debuted at No. 46 on the Billboard Hot Country Songs chart for the week of October 19, 2013, and reached a peak of No. 39.

Critical reception

Like a Rose has received universal praise from critics for its traditional country sound. On Metacritic, a website which assigns a normalised rating out of 100 from reviews by mainstream critics, it currently holds a rating of 89 out of 100, signifying Universal Acclaim, based on 9 reviews.

Billy Dukes of Taste of Country favorably said that "no one does anguish quite like Ashley Monroe. On her new album, ‘Like a Rose,’ the singer redefines bittersweet for a country music audience that is still very much learning her name." Slant Magazines Jonathan Keefe praised Monroe's ability at "bringing authentic emotions and experiences into compelling narratives that showcase a real mastery of voice." Roughstock reviewer Dan MacIntosh compared her favorably to other female artists Kacey Musgraves and Miranda Lambert. MacIntosh complimented the duet with Blake Shelton ("You Ain't Dolly [And You Ain't Porter]") for its humor and its blending of traditional and contemporary country. Stephen Thomas Erlewine of AllMusic praised Monroe for bringing traditional country music to the present and blending it with contemporary attitudes. He named "Two Weeks Late," "Weed Instead of Roses," and "Monroe Suede" as the album's standout tracks. MSN Musics Robert Christgau found that Monroe "put this much care into every song even if you're not convinced by the one that connects whipped cream and whips." Bill West of Got Country Online said that "Ashley Monroe is stepping in to shake things up a bit with a double helping of pedal steel and tradition." Jody Rosen of Rolling Stone called the album "riveting, beautifully sung, sharp-witted", and "even better" than "her hard-drawlin' vocals on Hell on Heels" by the Pistol Annies. Rosen summed up the album as "nine songs, 32 minutes [and] no false moves", writing that although the album "comes on traditionalist, with old-fashioned production, countrypolitan ballads and punchline-packed honky-tonkers", it is also "modern" when it "drops references to Fifty Shades of Grey"

Tammy Ragusa of Country Weekly wrote that Monroe "has raised that bar" on this album, which is an "outstanding" release as evidenced by the A-grade, and this is because "the album combines Ashley’s almost ethereal voice with a healthy dose of sawing fiddle, pedal steel and doghouse bass to give the entire project an über-traditional country slant." Ragusa wrote that "if you’ve ever bemoaned the absence of traditional country sounds in an era of pop, rock and even hip-hop production, be still—Ashley Monroe is throwing you a country music lifeline. Whether country radio will embrace it is anybody’s guess. But if they don’t, shame on them." Holly Gleason of Paste wrote that "Like A Rose is no fairy tale.... Less is sometimes more, knowing better than dreaming; on Like A Rose, it’s a powerful reminder of that value beyond perfection, something Ashley Monroe knows by heart." Chuck Eddy of Spin called the album "indelibly catchy." Brian Mansfield of USA Today said that Monroe on this album "turns hilarious and heartbreaking, everyone can hear what the fuss is about." Jon Caramanica of The New York Times gave the album a positive review, writing that "there’s not likely to be a more earthy feeling and backward-sounding country album released on a major label this year". In December 2013, Rolling Stone ranked Like a Rose #18 on its list of the best 50 albums of 2013 and Billboard named it the best country album of the year. The Washington Post named it the 5th best album of the year.

Commercial performance
For the week of March 23, 2013, the album was the number 10 sold Country album in the United States, and it was the number 43 sold album in the United States as a whole on the 200 chart.

Track listing

Personnel
Compiled from liner notes.

Musicians
 Richard Bennett – acoustic guitar (1,2,3,5,6,8,9), electric guitar (4), archtop guitar (7)
 Mike Brignardello – bass guitar (3,5,7,8)
 Dennis Crouch – upright bass
 Eric Darken – percussion (3,4,5,7)
 Stuart Duncan – fiddle (3,4,6-9)
 Paul Franklin – steel guitar (1-4,6-9), Dobro (5)
 Steve Gibson – acoustic guitar (1), electric guitar (2-9)
 Vince Gill – acoustic guitar (1-6,8), electric guitar (7)
 Tony Harrell – accordion (1), piano (2,6)
 John Barlow Jarvis – piano (4,8,9), synthesizer (3), Hammond B-3 organ (5)
 Greg Morrow – drums
 Michael Rhodes – bass guitar (1,2,4,6,9)

Backing vocalists
 Vince Gill – tracks 1, 4, 6, 7
 Wes Hightower – tracks 2, 7
 Rebecca Lynn Howard – tracks 2, 3
 Sonya Isaacs – track 8
 Carl Jackson – track 8
 Little Big Town – track 5
 Richard Marx – track 3
 Jon Randall – track 6
 Andrea Zonn – track 6

Technical
 Drew Bollman – recording
 Jim Demain – mastering
 Vince Gill – production
 Justin Niebank – production, engineering, mixing
 Matt Rausch – recording

Chart performance

Album

Singles

References

Warner Records albums
2013 albums
Ashley Monroe albums